Simeonov Island is the 850 m long in north-south direction and 390 m wide rocky island with surface area of  separated from the south coast of Coronation Island in the South Orkney Islands, Antarctica by a passage narrowing to just 50 m at points. The island faces Slanchev Bryag Cove on the east.  It is a new feature that became detached from the main island as a result of glacier retreat in the first decade of 21st century.  An abutting smaller island on the south ends up in Saunders Point.

The island is "named after Captain Anastas Simeonov (1929–2003), Director (1976–1982) of the Bulgarian company Ocean Fisheries – Burgas whose ships operated in the waters of South Georgia, Kerguelen, the South Orkney Islands, South Shetland Islands and Antarctic Peninsula from 1970 to the early 1990s.  The Bulgarian fishermen, along with those of the Soviet Union, Poland and East Germany are the pioneers of modern Antarctic fishing industry."

Location
British mapping in 1963.

Maps
 British Antarctic Territory: South Orkney Islands. Scale 1:100000 topographic map. DOS Series 510. Surrey, England: Directorate of Overseas Surveys, 1963
 Antarctic Digital Database (ADD). Scale 1:250000 topographic map of Antarctica. Scientific Committee on Antarctic Research (SCAR). Since 1993, regularly upgraded and updated

Notes

References
 Simeonov Island. SCAR Composite Gazetteer of Antarctica

External links
 Simeonov Island. Copernix satellite image

 

Islands of the South Orkney Islands
Ocean Fisheries – Burgas Co
Bulgaria and the Antarctic